Homewood station is a train station in Homewood, Illinois. It could also refer to:
 Homewood railway station in Victoria, Australia
 Homewood station (PAAC), a bus rapid transit station in Pittsburgh, Pennsylvania